The 2020 CDC Tour consisted of 8 darts tournaments on the 2020 PDC Pro Tour.

The COVID-19 pandemic saw the original calendar replaced with a new one, with separate USA and Canada Tours taking place instead of a combined tour. 

The highest ranking player from each nation qualified for the 2022 PDC World Darts Championship.

Prize money
Each event had a prize fund of $8,800.

This is how the prize money is divided:

Canada Tour

Canada Tour 1
Canada Tour 1 was contested on Saturday 26 September 2020 in Woodstock, Ontario, Canada.

Canada Tour 2
Canada Tour 2 was contested on Saturday 26 September 2020 in Woodstock, Ontario, Canada.

Canada Tour 3
Canada Tour 3 was contested on Sunday 27 September 2020 in Woodstock, Ontario, Canada.

Canada Tour 4
Canada Tour 4 was contested on Sunday 27 September 2020 in Woodstock, Ontario, Canada.

USA Tour

USA Tour 1
USA Tour 1 was contested on Saturday 3 October 2020 in Indianapolis, Indiana, United States.

USA Tour 2
USA Tour 2 was contested on Saturday 3 October 2020 in Indianapolis, Indiana, United States.

USA Tour 3
USA Tour 3 was contested on Sunday 4 October 2020 in Indianapolis, Indiana, United States.

USA Tour 4
USA Tour 4 was contested on Sunday 4 October 2020 in Indianapolis, Indiana, United States.

References

2020 in darts
2020 PDC Pro Tour
September 2020 sports events in Canada
October 2020 sports events in the United States